Human Hearts is an album by the indie pop band Maritime. It is the band's fourth full-length album and was released on April 5, 2011.

Track listing 
 "It's Casual" — 2:46
 "Paraphernalia" — 3:26
 "Black Bones" — 2:53
 "Peopling of London" — 3:05
 "Air Arizona" — 3:10
 "Faint of Hearts" — 5:10
 "Annihilation Eyes" — 3:13
 "Out Numbering" — 4:01
 "C’mon Sense" — 3:29
 "Apple of My Irony" — 4:10

References

2011 albums
Maritime (band) albums
Dangerbird Records albums